ORP Kraków (823) is a Lublin-class minelayer-landing ship of Polish Navy, named after the city of Kraków.

Construction and career 
The ship was built at the Northern Shipyard in Gdańsk. The main designer was MSc. Stanisław Keński. The keel was laid on 18 August 1988 and the ship was launched on 7 March 1989; the godmother is Mrs. Krystyna Rafa. The flag was raised on 27 June 1990.

ORP Kraków is the second ship in history to bear this name. The first was the river monitor, built in the Kraków shipyard of Fabryka Zieleniewski. She served in the years 1926-39.

Gallery

References

Lublin-class minelayer-landing ships
1989 ships
Ships built in Gdańsk